Don Tobin (1 November 1955) is an English retired footballer who played in leagues including the English Football League, the League of Ireland, the American Soccer League, and Major Indoor Soccer League. Since 1995 he has coached at various levels in the Tampa Bay Area, most often with women's teams.

Playing career
As a youth, Tobin spent a brief period with the Everton Academy before catching on at age 16 with the First Division senior club, Everton in 1971. From there he moved to Rochdale of the Third Division for three years. He spent one season at Witton Albion and one in Ireland at Sligo Rovers before moving to the United States. While at Rovers he was part of the side that reached the 1977–78 FAI Cup finals.

For many years he spent summers with outdoor teams and winters playing indoor soccer. From 1978 to 1980 he played for the California Sunshine and joined the indoor Wichita Wings of MISL from 1980 to 1982. From 1981 to 1983 he played for the Carolina Lightnin' outdoors and from 1982 to 1984 with Los Angeles Lazers indoors. With a goal and an assist, Tobin was named MVP of the 1981 ASL finals, which Carolina won, 2–1. He would spend the next three indoor seasons with the American Indoor Soccer Association's Canton Invaders, winning AISA titles in 1984–85 and 1985–86. Tobin was an AISA all-star and league MVP in 1985–86 for the Invaders. He had brief hitches outdoors with the Rochester Flash and Tulsa Tornados of the short-lived, United Soccer League. In 1988, he found his way to the Tampa Bay Rowdies, who at the time were playing in the third incarnation of the ASL. Tobin was player-coach for the indoor Memphis Rogues at the start of the 1989–89 season and finished out his playing career with the Orlando Lions in the American Professional Soccer League.

Coaching career
While still a player in Canton he also served as an assistant coach. In 1989–90 he was hired as the Head Coach of the Memphis Rogues of the AISA. Beginning in 1995, Tobin spent 19 years as the Director of Coaching, Dunedin Stirling Soccer Club in Dunedin, Florida. While there he also created the Tobin's School of Soccer Science Academy Program. In 2000, he was the coach of the Tampa Bay Extreme of the W-League. He was an Assistant Coach/Technical Director at the University of Tampa from 2007 to 2014, and part of the staff of the 2007 NCAA Division II Women's National Championship team. During the 2010 season he was an interim assistant coach for FC Tampa Bay Rowdies of the USSF Division 2 Professional League.

Tobin is presently the Director of Coaching at Pinellas County United in St. Petersburg, Florida and is a coach with the National Training Center (NTC). Since 2012, he also serves as the head coach of the WPSL team Florida Tropics WSC and holds a USSF "B" License. He and his wife reside in St. Petersburg, Florida and have two children.

Honours

Player
 FAI Cup runner-up: 1977–78

 ASL: 1981
 ASL Western Division: 1979
 ASL Freedom Conference: 1981

 AISA: 1984–85, 1985–86; runner-up 1986–87
 AISA Regular Season: 1984–85, 1985–86
 AISA Northern Division: 1986–87

Individual
 ASL First team All-Star: 1979, 1981
 ASL Finals MVP: 1981
 AISA League MVP: 1985–86
 AISA First team All-Star: 1985–86

Assistant coach
 NCAA Division II Women's Soccer: 2007

References

External links
Rochdale transfers
Club bio
University of Tampa coaching profile
ASL, MISL, AISA stats
Dunedin Stirling Soccer Club
Pinellas County United SC profile

1955 births
American Indoor Soccer Association coaches
American Indoor Soccer Association players
American Professional Soccer League players
American Soccer League (1933–1983) players
American Soccer League (1988–89) players
California Sunshine players
Canton Invaders players
Carolina Lightnin' players
Everton F.C. players
English Football League players
English footballers
English expatriate footballers
League of Ireland players
Los Angeles Lazers players
Major Indoor Soccer League (1978–1992) players
Memphis Storm players
Orlando Lions players
Rochdale A.F.C. players
Rochester Flash players
Sligo Rovers F.C. players
Tampa Bay Rowdies (1975–1993) players
Tulsa Tornados players
United Soccer League (1984–85) players
USL W-League (1995–2015) coaches
Wichita Wings (MISL) players
Living people
Association football midfielders
English expatriate sportspeople in the United States
Expatriate soccer players in the United States
Florida Tropics SC
English football managers
English expatriate football managers
Expatriate soccer managers in the United States
Tampa Bay Rowdies coaches